Trinity is the seventh studio album by Japanese singer Shizuka Kudo. It was released on March 18, 1992, through Pony Canyon. Trinity is Kudo's last album to be produced by Tsugutoshi Gotō. It yielded Kudo the single, "Mechakucha ni Naite Shimaitai", which became one of Kudo's signature ballads. The album also includes one of Kudo's longest recorded songs, the album closer "Suterareta Neko Janai Kara", which runs for over seven minutes.

Commercial performance
Trinity debuted at number three on the Oricon Albums Chart, with 99,000 units sold in its first week. The album dropped eight positions to number eleven on its second week, with 41,000 copies sold. It dropped to number nineteen the following week, selling 15,000 copies. Trinity spent nine consecutive weeks in the top 100, selling a reported total of 200,000 copies during its run, and ranked at number 91 on the year-end Oricon Albums Chart.

Track listing
All tracks composed and arranged by Tsugutoshi Gotō, except "Mechakucha ni Naite Shimaitai" arranged by Gotō and Satoshi Kadokura.

Charts

Certification

Release history

References

1992 albums
Shizuka Kudo albums
Pony Canyon albums